Merewether United Football Club is a Newcastle Football association team in Newcastle, Australia.

History
The club was founded in 1953. In 1965 it moved to its current home ground at Myamblah Crescent in Merewether. This ground was built on the remnants of the old Glebe Colliery complex, which closed in 1959 due to an industry slump. This was served by a company railway from The Junction, past its school then up Merewether Street embankment crossing Llewellyn, Caldwell & Ridge Streets, past the telephone exchange, up Morgan Street, crossing Yule Road to the Newcastle Coal Mining Company's colliery complex.

In 2009 the club launched a team in the inaugural Northern NSW Women's Premier League, although the team was unsuccessful in making the final series.

In 2009 the club had a very successful year, with 16 teams going into the final series with 9 teams reaching the grand final, 7 winning grand finals and 5 teams achieving minor premierships.

2009 Minor Premier Teams were the 10B, 13C (Dom Ritter's team), All Age Women/D, 18B girls & All Age Women/A  teams.

Grand Finals results over weekend of 12/13 September 2009:.....
10L – MUFC vs Tilligery – MUFC went down 0–5 to a team that was undefeated throughout the year....
10B – MUFC vs Belmont – MUFC 2–0 winners....
15G – MUFC vs Nelson Bay – MUFC winners 4–1....
11K – MUFC vs Valentine -MUFC 4–0 winners....
16A girls – MUFC vs Adamstown MUFC – 1–0 win....
13C – MUFC vs Scone – MUFC 1–0 winners....
18B girls – MUFC vs Maitland another 1–0 winner for MUFC....
AAW/A – MUFC vs Kurri Kurri a penalty shoot out decided this game with MUFC going down 3–2 to Kurri....
17C – MUFC vs Adamstown MUFC 4–0 winners

Sources

External links
 Merewether United FC Official Website

Soccer clubs in Newcastle, New South Wales
Association football clubs established in 1953
1953 establishments in Australia